Eat Bulaga! is a noontime Philippine television variety show that premiered on Radio Philippines Network on July 30, 1979. Produced by TAPE Inc., the show features numerous segments that are differentiable. It initially featured Tito Sotto, Vic Sotto, Joey de Leon, Chiqui Hollman, and Richie D'Horsie; the show's cast changed significantly during its run.

Since its broadcast on GMA Network, Eat Bulaga! is the longest-running variety show in the Philippines with over 12,000 episodes. It has enjoyed consistently high viewership on broadcast television, according to AGB Nielsen Philippines and Kantar Media Philippines. The show's impact on television resulted in the creation of the international spin-off programs and the supercouple AlDub, which inspired various Internet memes, other mediums, and the global popularity on social media.

The show has received various awards and nominations. These include the Asian Television Awards, PMPC Star Awards for Television, Box Office Entertainment Awards, and Golden Screen TV Awards.

Aliw Awards
The Aliw Awards is an awards ceremony organized by the Aliw Awards Foundation, Inc. that gives recognition to entertainers who perform live in the Philippines and abroad. The SexBomb Girls and EB Babes have been nominated as the Best Modern Dance Company in 2007 and 2008.

Anak TV Seal Awards
The Anak TV Seal Awards are awarded annually to honor wholesome and family-friendly television shows and personalities who exemplify good values to children. Eat Bulaga! has been included for three consecutive years as one of the most well-liked television program and some of its hosts have also been admired as child-friendly television personalities.

Asian Television Awards
The Asian Television Awards is an annual awards ceremony that recognizes programming, performance, and production excellence in the Asian television industry. Eat Bulaga! won once for the special episode of its 25th anniversary celebration, becoming the first award won by the show from an international award-giving body.

Box Office Entertainment Awards
The Box Office Entertainment Awards is an annual awards ceremony organized by the Guillermo Mendoza Memorial Scholarship Foundation, Inc. that honors stars and performers simply for their popularity and commercial success in the Philippine entertainment industry. In 2007, Eat Bulaga!s former mainstay SexBomb Dancers were elevated to the Hall of Fame due to their five consecutive wins as the Most Popular Dance Group. In addition to multiple awards, Eat Bulaga! also received a special citation for its special episode, "AlDub: Sa Tamang Panahon," for gaining the highest record rating of a noontime show of all time.

Catholic Social Media Awards
The Catholic Social Media Awards are given by church-based organizations Youth Pinoy and Areopagus Communications during the annual Catholic Social Media Summit to recognize personalities and groups in the entertainment industry who are promoting Christian values. In 2015, the production company and the stars behind Kalyeserye became the first recipients of the Catholic Social Media Awards for spreading traditional virtues and good values through the segment.

Eastwood City Walk of Fame
The Eastwood City Walk of Fame is a sidewalk along Eastwood City, Quezon City that serves as a Philippine entertainment hall of fame. It is embedded with hundreds of brass star plaques featuring the names of celebrities for their popularity and contributions to the entertainment industry. Several hosts of the show have been inducted into the Walk of Fame.

EdukCircle Awards
The award-giving body of the EdukCircle Awards aims to recognize exemplary performances of media practitioners and entertainment celebrities as voted by participating universities across the Philippines. Eat Bulaga!'''s AlDub won two awards.

 Face of Advertising and Marketing Excellence (FAME) Awards 
The Face of Advertising and Marketing Excellence (FAME) Awards is an awards ceremony presented by the Junior Marketing Association of the De La Salle University – Dasmariñas in order to recognize and honor individuals who have made a mark a breakthrough in the marketing, promotion, and advertising industry in the previous year. Eat Bulaga! child wonders Ryzza Mae Dizon and Sebastian Benedict each won once.  

FAMAS Awards
The FAMAS Awards are the annual honors given by the Filipino Academy of Movie Arts and Sciences to recognize excellence in cinematic achievements. In 2015, the legendary trio of Tito Sotto, Vic Sotto, and Joey de Leon were honored with the FAMAS Lifetime Achievement Award for their contributions to Philippine cinema.

Filipino Franchise Show
Launched by the Association of Filipino Franchisers, Inc., the Filipino Franchise Show is a trade fair that promotes excellence and growth in franchising by showcasing the potential of homegrown Filipino businesses. Antonio P. Tuviera, the producer of Eat Bulaga!, was honored for being the first to have successfully franchised a Filipino television show, in this case, the long-running noontime show Eat Bulaga! to Indonesia.

Gawad Tanglaw Awards
The Gawad Tanglaw Awards is an academe-based award giving body that honors outstanding works and personalities in film, television, radio, print, and theater arts that contribute to the development of Philippine arts as a whole. In addition to the awards received by some of its hosts, Eat Bulaga! was honored with a Lifetime Achievement Award in 2011 for its more than three decades of bringing happiness to the Filipino people.   

GEMS Hiyas ng Sining Awards
The GEMS Hiyas ng Sining Awards is an academe-based awards ceremony organized by the Guild of Educators, Mentors, and Students (GEMS) that honors outstanding works and personalities in print, radio, film, theatre, and television. Eat Bulaga! won once.

Gintong Kabataan Awards
The Gintong Kabataan Awards is an event presented by the provincial government of Bulacan that aims to recognize outstanding youth from their province who have excelled in their respective fields and have inspired others to live to their fullest potential. Eat Bulaga! host and Bulacan native Maine Mendoza was a 2015 awardee.

Global Pinoy Awards
The Global Pinoy Awards is an event hosted by MEGA Magazine to honor homegrown talents whose crafts have defied the odds to succeed in the global stage and to ultimately become icons of Philippine culture. Eat Bulaga! creative head Jenny Ferre was honored for her contributions to the  success of the phenomenal loveteam AlDub and the segment Kalyeserye.

Golden Screen TV Awards
The Golden Screen TV Awards is given annually by the Entertainment Press Society, Inc. to acknowledge the outstanding programs and personalities from different television networks in the country. The show and its hosts have been honored numerous times.

Illumine
Illumine is an annual innovation awards ceremony presented by Global City Innovative College to  recognize outstanding and innovative personalities and programs on Philippine television. The show and its hosts were hailed as most innovative in their respective categories. 

Inding-Indie Short Film Festival Awards
The Inding Indie Short Film Festival aims to support independent filmmakers and independent artists who are passionate about the media arts. Its awards ceremony recognizes films, television programs, and personalities for their noteworthy contributions to the media and entertainment industry. In 2015, Eat Bulaga! was hailed as the Best TV Show. 

Kagitingan Awards for Television
Established in 2013, the Kagitingan Awards for Television are awarded annually by the Bataan Peninsula State University to recognize ten television programs from any kind of genre and ten television personalities who depicted a sense of valor in their respective shows. The recognition is based on the importance or values of heroism in its different faces. After being included five consecutive times, Eat Bulaga! was finally inducted into the Hall of Fame in 2017.

Mabini Media Awards
The Mabini Media Awards is presented by the Polytechnic University of the Philippines to acknowledge noteworthy programs, personalities, and advocacies of the television and radio industry, advertising, and new media. Eat Bulaga! won once. 

Nickelodeon Kids' Choice Awards
The Nickelodeon Kids' Choice Awards is an annual international awards show that honors the year's biggest television, movie, and music stars, as voted by Nickelodeon viewers. Eat Bulaga! host Maine Mendoza emerged victorious as she was named Favorite Pinoy Personality in 2016. 

Northwest Samar State University Students' Choice Awards for Radio and Television
The Northwest Samar State University Students' Choice Awards for Radio and Television is an annual event that grants awards to programs and personalities that have great contributions in the field of broadcasting and entertainment. After winning five consecutive years in the same category, both Eat Bulaga! and its host Vic Sotto were inducted in 2015 to the Circle of Excellence, which is the academe's specific term for its hall of fame. 

OFW Gawad Parangal
The OFW Gawad Parangal is an award given to pay tribute to individuals, groups, and organizations who unselfishly share their time, skills, and resources for the welfare of overseas Filipinos. It is awarded by KAKAMMPI, Inc., a community-based organization of Overseas Filipino Workers.

Paragala Central Luzon Media Awards 
The Paragala Central Luzon Media Awards is an awards ceremony presented by the Holy Angel University to recognize Central Luzon's choices of the best organizations, personalities, and programs on both local and national television. Eat Bulaga! won twice. 

Party Pilipinas Most Liked Awards
The Party Pilipinas Most Liked Awards was an awards ceremony presented by the now-defunct Sunday musical variety show Party Pilipinas that aims to recognize the most liked Kapuso artists through online and text voting. Eat Bulaga! child wonder Ryzza Mae Dizon received an award once. 

People's Choice Awards
The People's Choice Awards is presented by the People Asia Magazine to various individuals from all walks of life who inspire, encourage, and make a difference in the lives of others. After being featured on the cover of the magazine, Eat Bulaga!s AlDub were then chosen as People of the Year for becoming a global social phenomenon.

PEP List Awards
The PEP List is presented by the Philippine Entertainment Portal to honor showbiz personalities, television shows, and movies that made a great impact in the year. The list is divided into two categories: Editors' Choice and PEPsters' Choice. The Editors' Choice subcategories will be chosen by the editors and staff of PEP, while the PEPsters' Choice subcategories will be decided upon by PEP users through an online poll. In addition to numerous awards received by its hosts, Eat Bulaga! emerged as the daytime TV show of 2014.

Editors' Choice

PEPsters' Choice

Platinum Stallion Media Awards
The Platinum Stallion Media Awards is an award-giving body of the Trinity University of Asia to honor the academe's choices for the year's best and brightest in television, radio, and print media. Eat Bulaga! won twice as the Best Noontime Show and received a citation as the Best Entertainment Program. The comic troika of Jose Manalo, Wally Bayola, and Paolo Ballesteros also received a special recognition for their roles in the segment Kalyeserye.

PMPC Star Awards for Television
Founded by the Philippine Movie Press Club in 1987, the PMPC Star Awards for Television is a major award-giving body that recognizes the outstanding programming produced by the several television networks in the Philippines. After winning fifteen times as the Best Variety Show, Eat Bulaga! was finally inducted into the Hall of Fame in 2009. Its Hall of Fame status makes Eat Bulaga! ineligible to be nominated in the same category again. Its hosts have also been nominated in numerous different categories. 

Reader's Digest Trusted Brands Awards
The Trusted Brands Awards is a biennial awards ceremony presented by Reader's Digest Asia based on a survey conducted with thousands of consumers across seven markets in Asia to provide a credible source of review on the most trusted brands in the region. Vic Sotto and Ryan Agoncillo were named as one of the most trusted personalities for their contributions in the Philippine entertainment industry. 

Tatt Awards
Globe Telecom's Tatt Awards celebrates the ten individuals, groups, or communities who have made a great impact in social media with their brand of content. The awardees, known as "The Great Ten," are distinguished for their positive acts, ideas, talents, or movements that achieved greatness by choosing to connect online. Eat Bulaga! and Paolo Ballesteros were included in the list for their heavy presence in social media during the peak of the AlDub phenomenon. 

UmalohokJuan Awards
The annual UmalohokJuan Awards is organized by the Lyceum of the Philippines to recognize media entities and personalities that epitomize excellence in the field of television and radio broadcasting, print, advertising, and public relations. Eat Bulaga! and its host Vic Sotto have received two awards.

USTv Students' Choice Awards 
Born in 2005, the USTv Students' Choice Awards is a yearly awarding ceremony hosted by the University of Santo Tomas that recognizes excellence and Christian values in local television programs and personalities. Awards are based on students' preferences survey that accounts for Catholic and humanist values. Eat Bulaga! was chosen as the best variety show numerous times and the best television show of the year once.

Yahoo! Celebrity Awards
Yahoo! Celebrity Awards (formerly Yahoo! OMG Awards) is an awards ceremony presented by Yahoo! Philippines that honors the most popular personalities and programs across television, movies, music, social media, and sports. The nominees are voted into the top ranks by their fans across the world. Eat Bulaga! has won three awards from fourteen nominations. 

 Summary 
Here is the summary of awards and nominations received by Eat Bulaga!'' as of June 6, 2019.

References

External links
 

Eat Bulaga!
Eat Bulaga!